Sir Derek Malcolm Day  (29 November 1927 – 7 March 2015) was a British diplomat and field hockey player who competed in the 1952 Summer Olympics. He was educated at Hurstpierpoint College and St Catharine's College, Cambridge.

Field hockey
A field hockey player, Day competed for Great Britain in the 1952 Summer Olympics winning a bronze medal and played club hockey for Southgate Hockey Club.

Diplomatic career
Day joined the Foreign and Commonwealth Office in 1951 and went on to serve as UK Ambassador to Ethiopia from 1975 to 1978, and UK High Commissioner to Canada from 1984 to 1987. He was made  in 1984, having been made CMG in 1973.

Honours
  Knight Commander of the Order of St Michael and St George (KCMG) - 1984

References

External links
 
Interview with Sir Derek Malcolm Day & transcript, British Diplomatic Oral History Programme, Churchill College, Cambridge, 1997

1927 births
2015 deaths
People educated at Hurstpierpoint College
Alumni of St Catharine's College, Cambridge
British male field hockey players
Olympic field hockey players of Great Britain
Field hockey players at the 1952 Summer Olympics
Olympic bronze medallists for Great Britain
Olympic medalists in field hockey
Ambassadors of the United Kingdom to Ethiopia
High Commissioners of the United Kingdom to Canada
Knights Commander of the Order of St Michael and St George
Knights Bachelor
Medalists at the 1952 Summer Olympics
Southgate Hockey Club players